Bunias orientalis, the Turkish wartycabbage, warty-cabbage, hill mustard, or Turkish rocket, is an edible wild plant species in the genus Bunias.
It is classified as an invasive neophyte in most of Middle Europe and parts of North America.

References

Brassicaceae
Plants described in 1753
Taxa named by Carl Linnaeus